Gillen may refer to:

People
 Aidan Gillen (born 1968), actor
Aiden Gillen (born 1986), farming entrepreneur
 Brian Gillen (born 1970), member of the Irish Republican Army
 Charles P. Gillen (1876–1956), mayor of Newark, New Jersey, US
 Dolores Gillen (1914/1915-1947), American actress
 Francis James Gillen (1855–1912), Australian anthropologist and ethnologist
 Gerard Gillen, professor of music
 Gwen Gillen (1941-2017), American artist
 Kieron Gillen (born 1975), journalist and comic book writer
 Mary A. Gillen (1894–1963), New York politician
 Michael J. Gillen (1885–1942), New York politician
 Pete Gillen (born 1947), American college basketball coach and television commentator
 Peter Paul Gillen (1858–1896), storekeeper and politician in South Australia
 Ray Gillen (1959–1993), singer with various bands, among them Black Sabbath
 Shelley Gillen, Canadian producer and screenwriter
 Simon Gillen (1855-1918), Wisconsin, US politician and judge
 Cathy Gillen Thacker, American author of romance novels
 Gillen Wood, assistant professor of English

Places
 Gillen, Isle of Skye, a village on the island of Skye, Scotland
 Gillen, Northern Territory, a suburb of Alice Springs, Australia

See also
 Gillan (disambiguation)

Surnames of Irish origin